The 2009–10 LSU Tigers men's basketball team represented the Louisiana State University in the 2009–10 college basketball season. The head coach was Trent Johnson, who was in his second season at LSU. The team played its home games in the Pete Maravich Assembly Center in Baton Rouge, Louisiana, and is a member of the Southeastern Conference. They finished the season 11–20, 2–14 in SEC play and lost in the first round of the 2010 SEC men's basketball tournament.

Previous season 
Trent Johnson completed his first season as head coach of the Tiger men's basketball team in 2009. His first season was very successful as the Tigers won the SEC West division title and the overall SEC regular-season title which earned them the #1 seed in the 2009 SEC men's basketball tournament. As a result of earning the top seed, the Tigers received a first-round bye. The Tigers defeated the Kentucky Wildcats in the second round 67-58. However, Mississippi St. proved to be too much in the semi-finals eliminating the Tigers 57-67.

After the SEC Tournament, the Tiger's fate was in the hands of the NCAA Tournament selection committee. The Tigers were awarded the #8 seed in the South bracket for the 2009 NCAA Men's Division I Basketball Tournament. This was the first time the Tigers had made the NCAA tournament since making it to 2006 Final Four. The Tigers had to travel to Greensboro, North Carolina to play the first two rounds of the tournament.

In the opening round of the tournament, LSU squared off against the #9 seed Butler, who finished the regular season 26-5. The Tigers seemed to be in control of the game leading by as much as 13, and by a score of 35-29 at the half. However, Butler continued to fight their way back using the size of Matt Howard who finished the game with 22. In the end, though, the Tigers were able to prevail 75-71 behind Marcus Thornton's 30 points.

The 2008-09 squad compiled and overall record of 27-8, including a 13-3 mark in SEC play.

Preseason 
The 2009–10 Tigers men's basketball team had a much different look than the team that competed in the previous season. The Tigers replaced the following seniors from 2008–09:
 Chris Johnson, C, 2-year starter
 Garrett Temple, G, 4-year starter
 Marcus Thornton, G, drafted in the second round of the 2009 NBA draft by the Miami Heat
 Quinton Thornton, F, sixth man

However, Tasmin Mitchell decided to withdraw his name from the 2009 NBA draft and return to LSU for his red-shirt senior season. He joined junior Bo Spencer as the only two starters returning from last year.

Honors 
Senior forward Tasmin Mitchell was the only Tiger to receive any preseason accolades. Mitchell was recently named to watchlist for the 2009–10 Naismith Award, as well as being rated the #4 small forward in college basketball by Rivals.com. During SEC media days prior to the season, Mitchell was named a unanimous First Team All-SEC selection by the SEC coaches.

Recruiting class

Roster

Schedule 

! style="background:#FFF;color:#461D7C;"| Regular Season
|- valign="top"

|- bgcolor="#D8FFEB"
| 1 || November 13 || 7:00 p.m. || Louisiana–Monroe ||  || Maravich CenterBaton Rouge, Louisiana ||  || 9,081 || 82-62 || 1-0 || -
|- bgcolor="#D8FFEB"
| 2 || November 16 || 7:00 p.m. || Indiana State ||  || Maravich CenterBaton Rouge, Louisiana ||  || 8,113 || 56-45 || 2-0 || -
|- bgcolor="#D8FFEB"
| 3 || November 17 || 7:00 p.m. || Western Kentucky ||  || Maravich CenterBaton Rouge, Louisiana ||  || 8,220 || 71-60 || 3-0 ||  -
|- bgcolor="#FFE6E6"
| 4 || November 25 || 6:00 p.m. || #13 Connecticut ||  || Madison Square GardenNew York || ESPN2 ||  || 55-81 || 3-1 ||-
|- bgcolor="#FFE6E6"
| 5 || November 27 || 1:30 p.m. || Arizona State ||  || Madison Square GardenNew York || ESPN2 ||  || 52-71 || 3-2 || -
|-

|- bgcolor="#D8FFEB"
| 6 || December 1 || 6:30 p.m. || Louisiana-Lafayette ||  || Maravich CenterBaton Rouge, Louisiana || CST || 8,107 || 66-58 || 4-2 || -
|- bgcolor="#D8FFEB"
| 7 || December 12 || 7:00 p.m. || Northwestern St. ||  || Maravich CenterBaton Rouge, Louisiana ||  || 8,414 || 73-62 || 5-2 || -
|- bgcolor="#D8FFEB"
| 8 || December 14 || 7:00 p.m. || Southeastern La ||  || Maravich CenterBaton Rouge, Louisiana ||  || 8,003 || 77-60 || 6-2 || -
|- bgcolor="#D8FFEB"
| 9 || December 17 || 7:00 p.m. || Nicholls St. ||  || Maravich CenterBaton Rouge, Louisiana || CST || 7,957 || 63-60 || 7-2 || -
|- bgcolor="#D8FFEB"
| 10 || December 19 || 1:00 p.m. || Rice ||  || Maravich CenterBaton Rouge, Louisiana || CST || 8,629 || 65-61 || 8-2 || -
|- bgcolor="#FFE6E6"
| 11 || December 22 || 9:00 p.m. || Washington St. ||  || KeyArenaSeattle, WA ||  || 15,341 || 70-72 OT || 8-3 || -
|- bgcolor="#FFE6E6"
| 12 || December 29 || 6:00 p.m. || Xavier (Ohio) ||  || Cintas CenterCincinnati || ESPNU || 10,250 || 65-89 || 8-4 || -
|-

|- bgcolor="#FFE6E6"
| 13 || January 2 || 7:00 p.m. || Utah ||  || Maravich CenterBaton Rouge, Louisiana || CSS || 8,631  || 59-61 || 8-5 || -
|- bgcolor="#D8FFEB"
| 14 || January 4 || 7:00 p.m. || McNeese St. ||  || Maravich CenterBaton Rouge, Louisiana ||  || 7,807 || 83-60 || 9-5 || -
|- bgcolor="#FFE6E6"
| 15 || January 9 || 4:00 p.m. || Alabama ||  || Maravich CenterBaton Rouge, Louisiana || FSN || 9,666 || 49-66 || 9-6 || 0-1
|- bgcolor="#FFE6E6"
| 16 || January 13 || 7:00 p.m. || South Carolina ||  || Colonial Life ArenaColumbia, South Carolina || SECN || 12,103 || 58-67  || 9-7 || 0-2
|- bgcolor="#FFE6E6"
| 17 || January 16 || 7:00 p.m. || Florida ||  || O'Connell CenterGainesville, Florida || FSN || 11,627 || 58-72 || 9-8 || 0-3
|- bgcolor="#FFE6E6"
| 18 || January 20 || 7:00 p.m. || Auburn ||  || Maravich CenterBaton Rouge, Louisiana || SECN || 9,445 || 80-84 || 9-9 || 0-4
|- bgcolor="#FFE6E6"
| 19 || January 23 || 12:30 p.m. || #24 Ole Miss ||  || Maravich CenterBaton Rouge, Louisiana || SECN || 9,403 || 63-73 || 9-10 || 0-5
|- bgcolor="#FFE6E6"
| 20 || January 27 || 7:00 p.m. || Alabama ||  || Coleman ColiseumTuscaloosa, AL || SECN || 10,657 || 38-57 || 9-11 || 0-6
|- bgcolor="#FFE6E6"
| 21 || January 30 || 12:30 p.m. || Mississippi St. ||  || Humphrey ColiseumStarkville, Mississippi || SECN || 7,247 || 51-67 || 9-12 || 0-7
|-

|- bgcolor="#FFE6E6"
| 22 || February 4 || 8:00 p.m. ||#14 Tennessee ||  || Maravich CenterBaton Rouge, Louisiana ||  || 9,052 || 54-59 || 9-13 || 0-8
|- bgcolor="#FFE6E6"
| 23 || February 6 || 3:00 p.m. ||#4 Kentucky ||  || Maravich CenterBaton Rouge, Louisiana || SECN || 13,083 || 55-81 || 9-14 || 0-9
|- bgcolor="#FFE6E6"
| 24 || February 10 || 7:00 p.m. || Arkansas ||  || Bud Walton ArenaFayetteville, Arkansas || SECN || 12,777 || 52-87 || 9-15 || 0-10
|- bgcolor="#FFE6E6"
| 25 || February 13 || 12:30 p.m. || Vanderbilt ||  || Memorial GymnasiumNashville, Tennessee || SECN || 14,316 || 69-77 || 9-16 || 0-11
|- bgcolor="#FFE6E6"
| 26 || February 20 || 3:00 p.m. || Mississippi St. ||  || Maravich CenterBaton Rouge, Louisiana || SECN || 9,434 || 59-60 || 9-17 || 0-12
|- bgcolor="#D8FFEB"
| 27 || February 24 || 7:00 p.m. || Arkansas ||  || Maravich CenterBaton Rouge, Louisiana || SECN || 8,463 || 65-54 || 10-17 || 1-12
|- bgcolor="#FFE6E6"
| 28 || February 27 || 6:00 p.m. || Auburn ||  || Beard-Eaves-Memorial ColiseumAuburn, AL || FSN || 8,927 || 59-74 || 10-18 || 1-13
|-

|- bgcolor="#FFE6E6"
| 29 || March 4 || 8:00 p.m. || Ole Miss ||  || Tad Smith ColiseumOxford, Mississippi ||  || 6,430 || 59-72 || 10-19 || 1-14
|- bgcolor="#D8FFEB"
| 30 || March 6 || 4:00 p.m. || Georgia ||  || Maravich CenterBaton Rouge, Louisiana || FSN || 9,328 || 50-48 || 11-19 || 2-14
|-

|-
! style="background:#FFF;color:#461D7C;"| Post-Season
|- valign="top"

|- bgcolor="#FFE6E6"
| 29 || March 11 || 2:30 p.m. || #13 Tennessee || || Bridgestone ArenaNashville, Tennessee || SECN || 15,152 || 49-59 || 11-20
|-

References 

LSU
LSU Tigers basketball seasons
LSU
LSU